Armin Josef Julius Kellersberger (18 December 1838 – 28 July 1905) was a Swiss politician and President of the Swiss Council of States (1890/1891).

External links 
 
 

1838 births
1905 deaths
Members of the Council of States (Switzerland)
Presidents of the Council of States (Switzerland)